PGA Tour Champions (formerly the Senior PGA Tour and the Champions Tour) is a men's professional senior golf tour, administered as a branch of the PGA Tour.

History and format 

The Senior PGA Championship, founded in 1937, was for many years the only high-profile tournament for golfers over 50.  The idea for a senior tour grew out of a highly successful event in 1978, the Legends of Golf at Onion Creek Club in Austin, Texas, which featured competition between two-member teams of some of the greatest older golfers of that day. The tour was formally established in 1980 and was originally known as the Senior PGA Tour until October 2002.  The tour was then renamed the Champions Tour through the 2015 season, after which the current name of "PGA Tour Champions" was adopted.

Of the 26 tournaments on the 2010 schedule, all were in the United States except for the Cap Cana Championship in the Dominican Republic, the Senior Open Championship in Scotland and tournaments in Canada and South Korea. The guaranteed minimum official prize money is $51.5 million over 26 tournaments, with a record average purse of $1.98 million per event; slightly higher than the 2008 prize money of $51.4 million over the same number of events. The total prize money and number of events, however, are down from previous years—for example, the 2007 tour offered a total of $55.2 million over 29 events.

Most of the tournaments are played over three rounds (54 holes), which is one round fewer than regular professional stroke play tournaments on the PGA Tour. Because of this and having smaller fields (81 golfers), there are generally no "cuts" between any of the rounds.  However, the five senior majors have a full 72 holes (four rounds) with a 36-hole cut. Until 2015, the season-ending Charles Schwab Cup Championship, with a limited field of 36, was played over 72 holes with no cut. Since 2016, it has been played over 54 holes with no cut.  A golfer's performances can be quite variable from one round to the next, and playing an extra round increases the likelihood that the senior majors will be won by leading players.

Through the 2015 season, the Charles Schwab Cup was a season-long points race. Points were given to players who finished in the top 10. One point was earned for each $1,000 won (i.e. $500,000 = 500 points) with majors counting double. From the Cup's inception in 1990 through 2015, the top 30 players competed in the Charles Schwab Cup Championship, which was contested over four rounds and where all contestants earned points. The top five finishers in the points race earned annuities.

In 2016, the format of the Charles Schwab Cup was radically changed to a playoff-style format similar to that used for the FedEx Cup on the main PGA Tour. Qualification for the playoffs is now based on money earned during the PGA Tour Champions season. The top 72 players on the money list automatically qualify for the first playoff event, the PowerShares QQQ Championship. Additionally, if one or more golfers finish in the top 10 in the final non-playoff event, the SAS Championship, and are not in the top 72 on the money list entering the playoffs, the highest such finisher in the SAS Championship will also receive a playoff place. The playoffs operate on a points system, with each qualifying player receiving a points total equal to the money earned on the season. Points during the first two playoff events, the QQQ Championship and Dominion Charity Classic, are also based on money earned, except that the winner of each of those events receives double points. The playoff field is cut to 54 for the Dominion Charity Classic, and finally to 36 for the Charles Schwab Cup Championship. After the Dominion Charity Classic, the field's points are reset so that each of the remaining 36 players can theoretically win the Charles Schwab Cup, and that each of the top five players can clinch the Charles Schwab Cup by winning the final event.

In 2006, the Champions Tour Division Board of the PGA Tour organization voted to allow players the option to use golf carts during most events on the tour.  The five major championships and certain other events, including pro-ams, are excluded.

Exemptions and qualifying
Current PGA Tour Champions competitor and TV golf analyst Bobby Clampett has called the process for determining the field in tour events "the most complicated system known to man," and added that "[n]ot a single player even understands it fully."

Clampett attempted to explain the process in a 2011 post on his blog. Standard tour events—apart from invitationals and majors, which have their own entry criteria—have a field of 78 (currently 81). The first 60 places in the field are filled as follows:
 The top 30 players, not otherwise exempt, who finished in the top 50 of the previous year's PGA Tour Champions money list.
 Up to 30 players who are in the top 70 of the all-time combined PGA Tour and PGA Tour Champions money list. 
This leaves 18 places:
 Members of the World Golf Hall of Fame eligible by age.
 Winners of PGA Tour Champions events in the previous 12 months.
 At the start of the season, 5 players from the previous year's PGA Tour Champions Qualifying Tournament, in order of finish. During July, this category changes to include all non-exempt players based on the season's money list.
 Previously exempt players coming off medical exemptions.
 Top four players in their first two years of age eligibility with multiple PGA Tour wins.
 One spot for the highest finisher, not already exempt, within the top 10 of the previous week's tournament. Note, however, that a top-10 finish in a regular tournament does not qualify a player for a major. In another quirk, a top-10 finish in a major does not qualify a player for the next tournament on the schedule, even if it is a regular tournament.
 Up to 5 spots for sponsor's exemptions, but subject to reduction or elimination if the previous categories fill out the field.
 Up to 4 spots for Monday qualifiers, also subject to reduction or elimination

2023 schedule

Money winners and most wins leaders
Players who lead the money list on PGA Tour Champions win the Arnold Palmer Award. No season-long awards were given in 2020 as, due to the COVID-19 pandemic, the tour switched to a wraparound season encompassing all of 2020 and 2021.

Multiple money list titles
The following players have won more than one money list title through 2021:
11: Bernhard Langer
3: Hale Irwin, Don January
2: Miller Barber, Bob Charles, Jim Colbert, Jay Haas, Dave Stockton, Lee Trevino

Leading career money winners
The table shows the top ten career money leaders on PGA Tour Champions through the 2022 season.

There is a full list on the PGA Tour's website here. The PGA Tour also publishes a list of PGA Tour Champions players' total career earnings on its three main tours here. The top player on that list after the 2022 season is Phil Mickelson, who has won a combined career total of $96,470,603.

See also
Golf in the United States
List of Champions Tour major championship winning golfers
List of golfers with most PGA Tour Champions wins
PGA Tour Champions awards
PGA Tour Champions records

References

External links

 
1980 establishments in Florida
Professional sports leagues in the United States